Harold Raymond Kingsmill "Barehands" Bates DSC (3 November 1916 – 9 May 2006) was an officer in the Royal Navy.  His father was the Rector of Horsington, Lincolnshire.  He was educated at St Michael's College, Tenbury Wells, Worcestershire, and at Magdalen College, Oxford University.

After having built a crystal radio receiver at the age of ten, Bates further developed his lifelong love for radio.  He joined the British Merchant Navy, but transferred to the Royal Navy in 1939 on the outbreak of war.  He saw active service in the Battle of the Atlantic and convoyed merchant and troop ships in the Mediterranean Sea and during the North Africa landings.

On 26 December 1943, Bates was the electrical officer aboard , the flagship of Admiral Sir Bruce Fraser, when the ship was in pursuit of the German battleship , which had sailed out of port in Norway to attack a convoy to Russia.  At one point, a German shell exploded near Bates's position near the antenna mast.  The explosion moved the Duke of York's radar antenna out of alignment.  In a winter force 8 gale, Bates climbed the mast to realign the antenna.  The British ship sank the German ship, and Bates was awarded the Distinguished Service Cross.  Dubbed "Barehands Bates" by the British press, the young officer became a national hero.  As radar was virtually unknown to the general public at the time, images depicted him holding two electrical cables together with his bare hands.

He was aboard  and witnessed the Japanese surrender in Tokyo Bay in 1945. He then commanded a landing party to find prisoner of war camps and release the prisoners.

As a Royal Navy Captain, Bates served as Assistant Director of Royal Naval Intelligence, and later as Deputy Director of the Admiralty Underwater Weapons Establishment.

Following the war, Bates specialized in the radar control of guns and missiles, and oversaw the development and testing of the Medium Range System Mark 3 (MRS3), an automatic radar control system for ships' guns.

He retired from the Royal Navy in 1969 after thirty years service, purchasing a filling station in Trowbridge, Wiltshire.

During the last two years of his life, Bates lived in a nursing home in Skegness, Lincolnshire, where he died.

References
"Honorary Unsubscribe", by Randy Cassingham

1916 births
2006 deaths
Alumni of Magdalen College, Oxford
British Merchant Navy personnel
Royal Navy officers of World War II
Recipients of the Distinguished Service Cross (United Kingdom)